Vania King and Yaroslava Shvedova defeated Elena Vesnina and Vera Zvonareva in the final, 7–6(8–6), 6–2 to win the ladies' doubles tennis title at the 2010 Wimbledon Championships.

Serena and Venus Williams were the two-time defending champions, but lost in the quarterfinals to Vesnina and Zvonareva.

Seeds

  Serena Williams /  Venus Williams (quarterfinals)
  Nuria Llagostera Vives /  María José Martínez Sánchez (withdrew)
  Nadia Petrova /  Samantha Stosur (third round)
  Gisela Dulko /  Flavia Pennetta (semifinals)
  Liezel Huber /  Bethanie Mattek-Sands (semifinals)
  Květa Peschke /  Katarina Srebotnik (quarterfinals)
  Lisa Raymond /  Rennae Stubbs (quarterfinals)
  Alisa Kleybanova /  Francesca Schiavone (withdrew)
  Chan Yung-jan /  Zheng Jie (first round)
  Maria Kirilenko /  Agnieszka Radwańska (second round)
  Cara Black /  Daniela Hantuchová (third round)
  Iveta Benešová /  Barbora Záhlavová-Strýcová (third round)
  Vera Dushevina /  Ekaterina Makarova (second round)
  Monica Niculescu /  Shahar Pe'er (second round)
  Alicja Rosolska /  Yan Zi (second round)
  Hsieh Su-wei /  Alla Kudryavtseva (third round)
  Chuang Chia-jung /  Olga Govortsova (second round)

Qualifying

Draw

Finals

Top half

Section 1

Section 2

Bottom half

Section 3

Section 4

References

External links

2010 Wimbledon Championships on WTAtennis.com
2010 Wimbledon Championships – Women's draws and results at the International Tennis Federation

Women's Doubles
Wimbledon Championship by year – Women's doubles
Wimbledon Championships
Wimbledon Championships